Anthony L. Starcer, (September 16, 1919 – June 9, 1986) was an American soldier and artist during World War II, known for his nose art work. 

Retiring as a sergeant in the US Army Air Force, Starcer was a line mechanic and artist for the 91st Bombardment Group (Heavy), of the VIII Bomber Command, Eighth Army Air Force, based at Bassingbourn, UK in 1942–43. 

He painted many pieces of nose art on the Fortresses of "The Ragged Irregulars", including the George Petty girl "Telephone Girl" for the Memphis Belle. The 91st Bombardment Group (H) website lists 124 aircraft that his work adorned.

In 1981, Starcer recreated his nose art at Dover Air Force Base, Delaware, for restored B-17G Shoo Shoo Baby, one of the few surviving combat veteran Flying Fortresses, based on Alberto Vargas' "Hawaii" Esquire pin up art. This B-17 flew 24 combat missions from England with the 91st BG, plus three aborts for mechanical problems, before being listed as missing in action on 29 May 1944. On its final mission, to the Focke Wulf aircraft component factory at Poznań, Poland, it crash-landed at Malmö Airport, Sweden, where it would see post-war service before becoming a museum piece.

He was married to Jackie Starcer.

References

Year of birth missing
United States Army Air Forces soldiers
United States Army Air Forces personnel of World War II
American artists
1986 deaths